Smoking in Greece was at the highest rate of tobacco consumption (more than 40%) in the European Union in 2010. In 2014, Greece had the highest rate of smoking in the European Union. According to a survey published by the European Commission Day for World No Tobacco Day in 2017, 37% of Greeks are smokers and only 44% of Greeks have never smoked a cigarette, the smallest percentage in the EU. After Greece, France and Bulgaria have the next largest number of smokers with 36%. At 7%, Sweden had the lowest rate.

2010 smoking ban

Since older legislation was not effective, a new, stricter law was passed. With effect of 1 September 2010, this law banned smoking and the consumption of tobacco products by other means, in all work places, transport stations, taxis and passenger ships (smoking was already prohibited on trains, buses and aeroplanes), as well as in all enclosed public places including restaurants, night clubs, etc., without any exception. Casinos and bars bigger than 300 m² were given eight months to apply the law. Smoking is also prohibited in atria and internal areas with removable roof covers or tents as well as in external seating areas that are surrounded by a tent and are not open from at least two sides. Fines are particularly heavy for smokers who do not comply (fines range from 50€ to 500€) as well as for work places or companies, i.e. restaurants, night clubs, pubs, etc. (fines range from 500€ to 10,000€). For those companies that violate the law for the fifth time in a row, the law requires the closure of the company.

As with the previous law, this new one is also not implemented and smoking is in reality permitted in the most public places in Greece. Signage indicating the smoking ban legislation is commonly ignored. The only exception to the law is airports. There, smoking is only permitted in special separated smoking booths equipped with separate ventilation systems and air filters. Currently only Athens International Airport has installed such booths: one in the extra-Schengen arrival area before passport control and one in the intra-Schengen baggage reclaim area, both smoking booths are accessible only to arriving passengers. In all other Greek airports no such smoking booths have been installed and smoking is totally prohibited inside the terminal buildings.

A website, now not in service, and a telephone hotline for information as well as citizens to report any violations of the new law (tel: 1142) along with an extensive media campaign were created to promote the 1 September smoking ban in Greece.

Effects of the smoking ban

Even eight years after the second phase of the ban supposedly went into effect, in July 2011, there is little evidence of the culture changing. Based on a pamphlet distributed in January 2018 by the Ministry of Health, strict fines are in place for those smoking illegally. The manager of every space that violates the anti-smoking ban, for vendors of tobacco products to those underage and for those violating the advertising laws for tobacco products could be fined between 500 and 10,000€. On a shop's fourth violation, its licence is suspended for ten days, while after the fifth violation it is revoked permanently. Furthermore, the law states that a driver may be fined up to 1,500€ for smoking with a minor (under 12 years of age) on board, regardless of who was smoking and it may be doubled if it is a public sector vehicle, such as a bus. Drivers may have their licences suspended for a month after each violation.

However, these are almost never enforced, because they are almost never reported. It is obvious that university buildings, cafés, bars and even hospital offices are not smoke-free areas. According to the Municipality of Athens, they do not carry out regular checks, due to limits in their staff numbers. The municipality has received minimal complaints, because people are disillusioned and do not believe that the law will be enforced. They would only investigate the issue further had more complaints or threats to sue been received.

Greece-Harvard Anti-Smoking Initiative

The government signed an agreement with Harvard University to help in developing the government's anti-tobacco policies and mounting publicity campaigns. The Harvard School of Public Health will also help Greece conduct research, organize conferences and train all the officials who will be involved in imposing the ban. The Hellenic Action through Research Against Tobacco, known as HEART, has conducted clinical research on the impact of smoking, especially on pregnant women, the effects of second-hand smoke and assessing whether creating a draft and ventilation or opening windows and doors does eliminate exposure to second hand smoke thus far. The initiative also plans to raise awareness with children, as early as elementary school and create a smoke-free environment on all school grounds across the country.

References

Greek culture
Health in Greece
Greece
Tobacco in Greece